Glen Chin (January 27, 1948 – August 16, 2018) was an American actor of Chinese descent who starred in film and television.

Background
Chin was born in Stockton, California on January 27, 1948. He was the eldest of eight children. His father owned the Quong Wah Yen sausage factory and grocery in Chinatown. He attended Amos Alonzo Stagg High School and was active in drama and choir. He studied music at the University of Pacific Conservatory of Music and played the double bass violin with the Stockton Symphony.

Chin appeared in 50 First Dates as the humorous Hawaiian café regular, The Underachievers (1987), and After One Cigarette as Shigeru. He appeared in Chinese cinema in such films as Hollywood Hong Kong. Chin's television credits include Boy Meets World (the Eskimo), Night Stand with Dick Dietrick (Coco), Mighty Max, and Seinfeld. He played a villain's role in the 1998 movie, Knock Off (film).

In the Seinfeld episode "The Opera", Chin plays Harry Fong, a character who buys a scalped ticket to an opera from George Costanza right before (or during) his girlfriend Susan ends up making the opera, so in the end, Jerry Seinfeld, Elaine Benes, Cosmo Kramer, Chin's character, and Susan all end up watching the opera.

In Michael Jackson's music video for "Black or White", Chin morphs into Tyra Banks.

Chin was married to Roberta Chow, the daughter of the Hong Kong film producer Raymond Chow.

Chin died in Stockon on August 16, 2018.

References

External links

1948 births
2018 deaths
American male film actors
American male television actors
Male actors from San Francisco
American male actors of Chinese descent